The Communist Party of Labour is a communist party in the Dominican Republic. The party was founded in 1980, after the split from the Maoist Dominican Popular Movement. PCT upheld the political line of the Party of Labour of Albania. The party is an active member of the International Conference of Marxist-Leninist Parties and Organizations.

The general secretary of the party is Manuel Salazar. The party publishes Lucha.

PCT takes part in elections through the Broad Front (Dominican Republic). In the last election MIUCA got 0.32% of the votes.

Sources
https://web.archive.org/web/20160121090659/http://www.broadleft.org/do.htm

External links
PCT website

1980 establishments in the Dominican Republic
Anti-revisionist organizations
Communist parties in the Dominican Republic
Hoxhaist parties
International Conference of Marxist–Leninist Parties and Organizations (Unity & Struggle)
Political parties established in 1980
Political parties in the Dominican Republic